Harriet Huntington Doerr (April 8, 1910 – November 24, 2002) was an American author whose debut novel was published at the age of 74.

Early life
A granddaughter of California railroad magnate and noted collector of art and rare books, Henry Edwards Huntington, Harriet Green Huntington grew up in a Pasadena, California, family that encouraged intellectual endeavors. She attended high school at Westridge School, in Pasadena. She then enrolled in Smith College in 1927, but transferred to Stanford University the following year where she was a member of Kappa Alpha Theta. In 1930, after her junior year, she left school and married Albert Doerr, Jr., a Stanford 1930 graduate whom she had known in Pasadena. The Doerrs spent the next 25 years in Pasadena, where they raised a son, Michael (d. 1995), and a daughter, Martha.

Mexico
Albert Doerr's family owned a copper mine in the Mexican state of Aguascalientes. Beginning in 1935, Harriet accompanied Albert on his many business trips there. In the late 1950s, the Doerrs moved to Mexico where Albert was engaged in restoring the mine. They remained until 1972 when Albert died, ten years after being diagnosed with leukemia. The time she spent in this small Mexican mining town would later provide Harriet with both the subject matter and the setting for much of her writing.

Literary career
Following her husband's death, Harriet Doerr returned to California. At the suggestion of her son Michael, a 1953 Stanford graduate, she decided to finish the education which had been interrupted so long before by her marriage. She enrolled, first at Scripps College, and then once again at Stanford. In 1977, she took her BA degree in European history. She began writing while at Stanford, earned a Stegner Fellowship in 1979, and soon began publishing short stories.

Her first novel, Stones for Ibarra, was published in 1984 and won a National Book Award that year, for First Work of Fiction.  Her second novel, Consider This, Señora, was published in 1993, and a collection of short stories and essays, Tiger in the Grass: Stories and Other Inventions, followed in 1995. A television adaptation of Stones for Ibarra was presented by Hallmark Hall of Fame in 1988. In the last decade of her life, she was legally blind from glaucoma.

Doerr died in Pasadena in 2002.

See also
 Huntington family

References

External links
 Late Bloomer by Yvonne Daley. Stanford Magazine. Nov-Dec 1997. Retrieved 2019-04-06.
 Harriet Doerr Papers, 1976-2003 (33 linear ft.) are housed in the Department of Special Collections and University Archives  at Stanford University Libraries

1910 births
2002 deaths
National Book Award winners
Writers from Pasadena, California
Stanford University alumni
Smith College alumni
PEN/Faulkner Award for Fiction winners
Scripps College alumni
American expatriates in Mexico